"Somebody's Leavin'" is a single by Canadian country music artist Patricia Conroy. Released in 1994, it was the first single from her album You Can't Resist. The song reached #1 on the RPM Country Tracks chart in December 1994.

Chart performance

References

1994 singles
Patricia Conroy songs
Songs written by Kostas (songwriter)
Songs written by Matraca Berg
Music videos directed by Steven Goldmann
1994 songs
Warner Music Group singles